The 103rd Division(() was created in October 1948 basing on defected 155th Reorganized Brigade of 96th Reorganized Corps, Republic of China Army. 

The division was a part of PLA 35th Corps.

In February 1949 the division absorbed 47th Division of Luzhongnan Column of the People's Liberation Army. 3 regiments from the original 161st Reorganized Brigade were merged as 308th Regiment, and 307th and 309th Regiments were reorganized from 139th and 140th Regiments from 47th Division, respectively.

In April 1949 the division took part in the Nanjing Campaign. 

From January 16 1950 the division was acting as Taizhou Military Sub-district.

On February 15 1951 the division was disbanded.

As of its disbandment the division was composed of:
307th Regiment;
308th Regiment;
309th Regiment.

References

中国人民解放军各步兵师沿革，http://blog.sina.com.cn/s/blog_a3f74a990101cp1q.html

Infantry divisions of the People's Liberation Army
Military units and formations established in 1948
Military units and formations disestablished in 1951